Performance Space New York, formerly known as Performance Space 122 or P.S. 122, is a non-profitable  arts organization founded in 1980 in the East Village neighborhood of Manhattan in an abandoned public school building.

Origin
The former elementary school was abandoned and in disrepair until a group of visual artists began to use the old classrooms for studios. In 1979, choreographer Charles Moulton began holding rehearsals and workshops in the second-floor cafeteria and invited fellow performers Charles Dennis, John Bernd, and Peter Rose to collaborate in the administration and use of the space. Tim Miller, John Bernd's lover, later joined the four in launching P.S. 122.

One of the earliest offerings created by the founders and choreographer Stephanie Skura was Open Movement, a weekly, non-performative, improvisational dance event. Early participants in Open Movement included artists Ishmael Houston-Jones, Yvonne Meier, Jennifer Monson, Yoshiko Chuma, Jennifer Miller, Jeremy Nelson, and Christopher Knowles, among other acclaimed dance and performance artists who are still working today. P.S. 122 began its presentation history in 1980 with the first "Avant-Garde-Arama," a multidisciplinary showcase, and published its first complete calendar of performances, classes, and workshops. The first full-length public play or performance presented in P.S. 122 in October 1980 was a play by Robin Epstein and Dorothy Cantwell's experimental women's theater company, More Fire! Productions.

Expansion
Mark Russell was hired as the artistic director in 1983 to curate and focus the overall programming, expanding it from a rental house into a year-round presenting facility.  P.S. 122 doubled its programming in 1986 when it converted the old gym on the first floor into a performance space to be used for extended runs of small theater groups and as a site for community meetings. Russell departed in 2004. Vallejo Gantner succeeded him in the position with the 2005–2006 season through 2017 and notably created Performance Space 122's annual winter series, the COIL Festival.

Funding 
In 2005, P.S. 122 was among 406 New York City arts and social service institutions to receive part of a $20 million grant from the Carnegie Corporation, made possible through a donation by New York City mayor Michael Bloomberg.

In 2011, funding from the New York City Department of Cultural Affairs initiated an extensive $37 million renovation of the First Avenue building that houses P.S. 122 and four other organizations. During the six-year process, P. S. 122 held programming at partner venues across New York City, including Danspace Project, The Chocolate Factory, Abrons Arts Center, The Invisible Dog Art Center, and La MaMa ETC, operating from administrative office spaces based in Brooklyn. P.S. 122's revamped spaces reopened in January 2018 with the premiere of “Visions of Beauty” by choreographer Heather Kravas, held as part of the 2018 COIL Festival.

Rebranding
In 2017, former MoMA PS1 curator Jenny Schlenzka was named Gantner's successor as executive artistic director, becoming the first female director in the organization's history. Coinciding with the reopening of its building, the organization announced its new name, Performance Space New York. The updated name is meant to signal "an ambition to be relevant and accessible to all of New York,” in Schlenzka's words, and to actively collaborate with the local community in its programs. Schlenzka's first full season of programming began in February–June 2018 with a series of performances, discussions, film screenings, and other presentations specifically themed around the East Village. The series paid homage to Performance Space New York's history while involving emerging artists and collectives reflective of the neighborhood today. Performance Space New York's new logo and identity was created by German visual artist Sarah Ortmeyer.

Facilities

Since its renovation in 2011, Performance Space New York now has two interdisciplinary theater spaces that showcase dance performances, performance art, art exhibitions, music performances, and film screenings.

Artist awards 
Performance Space New York supports two ongoing artist awards, The Spalding Gray Award and The Ethyl Eichelberger Award.

The Spalding Gray Award, named after the groundbreaking monologist Spalding Gray (1941–2004), is sponsored by a consortium that includes Kathleen Russo, Gray's widow; Performance Space New York; the Walker Art Center in Minneapolis; The Andy Warhol Museum in Pittsburgh; and On the Boards in Seattle. The award comes with a $20,000 commission to create new work and provides for a full production of that work presented by each organization. Past recipients include Tim Etchells, Richard Maxwell, Rabih Mroué, Young Jean Lee, National Theater of the United States of America, Radiohole, and Heather Woodbury.

The Ethyl Eichelberger Award, named for the flamboyant, trailblazing performer Ethyl Eichelberger (1945-1990), is awarded to an artist who "exemplifies Ethyl's larger-than-life style and generosity of spirit; who embodies Ethyl's multi-talented artistic virtuosity, bridging worlds and inspiring those around them." Recipients include Dane Terry, Mike Iveson, Taylor Mac, Julie Atlas Muz, Justin Vivian Bond, Jennifer Miller, Vaginal Davis, John Kelly, and Peggy Shaw.

References
Notes

External links

Official Website
PS122 Myspace

Theatres in Manhattan
Performance art in New York City
National Performance Network Partners
East Village, Manhattan
Arts organizations established in 1980
1980 establishments in New York City